Garcinia binucao is a species of flowering plant in the Clusiaceae family. It is commonly known as binukaw or batuan, is a species of Garcinia endemic to the Philippines. It is not cultivated, though its edible fruits are harvested from the wild for use as a souring agent in some Filipino dishes.

Taxonomy
Binukaw belongs to the genus Garcinia (the mangosteens) of the family Clusiaceae. The first description of the correct name of the species is attributed to the French botanist Jacques Denys Choisy in Description des guttifères de l'Inde (1849) based on the basionym Cambogia binucao from the Spanish friar and botanist Francisco Manuel Blanco in Flora de Filipinas in 1837.

The plant is known as binukaw (also spelled binucao, binukau, or bilukaw) in Tagalog, and batuan in Visayan languages. Other names include Ilocano balakut, Bikol buragris, and Panay Visayan haras. The common names are sometimes shared with other similar Garcinia species in the Philippines like Garcinia morella.

Description
The flowers are reddish to creamy white in color.

Distribution
Binukaw is endemic to the Philippines.

Culinary
The sour fruits are edible and can be eaten raw. They are also commonly used as a souring agent in traditional Filipino dishes like sinigang.

Conservation
The species is becoming rare due to illegal logging and deforestation for agriculture.

See also
Garcinia atroviridis, a related species used similarly in Malaysia, Indonesia, and Thailand
Garcinia dulcis
Garcinia gummi-gutta
Garcinia morella

References

binucao
Taxa named by Francisco Manuel Blanco
Taxa named by Jacques Denys Choisy
Endemic flora of the Philippines